Agnes Odhiambo, is a female human rights activist, who works as a senior researcher and advocate for women's rights at Human Rights Watch, since 2009.

Background and education
She was born in Kenya, and she attended local Kenyan schools for her pre-university education. Her Bachelor of Arts (BA) degree was obtained from the University of Nairobi. Her Master of Arts (MA) and Doctor of Philosophy (PhD) degrees were both obtained from the University of the Witwatersrand in Johannesburg, South Africa. Her academic research addressed the effect of HIV/AIDS on sexuality and gender.

Career
Before 2009, Agnes Odhiambo worked with the media in Eastern and Southern Africa, to promote women's rights. Her work included provision of space for women to speak out, by monitoring media outlets, training and research. After 2009, she has written extensively on matters affecting women, including obstetric fistula, sexual violence, the inadequate response to abuses against maternity patients by health workers in South Africa, and documented the negative outcomes of forced marriage and forced child marriage in South Sudan and Malawi. She also condemned the presidential directive in Tanzania to ban pregnant students from public schools.

References

External links
Website of Human Rights Watch
Zuma's Accuser Was 'Violated'

Living people
Year of birth missing (living people)
Kenyan activists
Kenyan women activists
University of Nairobi alumni
University of the Witwatersrand alumni
People from Nairobi